The aryepiglottic muscle, or aryepiglotticus muscle is an intrinsic muscle of the larynx.

The muscle originates from the muscular process of arytenoid cartilage and inserts to the aryepiglottic fold and lateral border of epiglottis. The aryepiglottic muscle is innervated by the inferior laryngeal nerve, a branch of the recurrent laryngeal nerve (a branch of the vagus nerve). The muscle adducts arytenoid cartilages and acts as a sphincter on the laryngeal inlet.

Additional images

External links
 

References 

Muscles of the head and neck